Umar Alam (born 7 March 1985) is an Indian cricketer. He made his List A debut for Jammu & Kashmir in the 2018–19 Vijay Hazare Trophy on 7 October 2018.

References

External links
 

1985 births
Living people
Indian cricketers
Jammu and Kashmir cricketers